Aluminium dodecaboride is a superhard chemical compound with 17% aluminium content by weight.

Properties
There are two crystalline forms, α-, and γ-. The phase β- is now believed to be the ternary boride .

Preparation
The β-form can be prepared by the reaction of boron(III) oxide with sulfur and aluminum, then adding carbon to the mixture.

Uses
The extreme hardness of  makes it a favorable component of PCBN inserts, which are mainly used in cutting and grinding to replace diamond or corundum.

See also
 Boron
 Aluminium boride

Footnotes

External links
"Boron";
"Lightness and hardness"

Borides
Aluminium compounds